Laccospadix is a monotypic genus of flowering plant in the palm endemic to Queensland. Only one species is known, Laccospadix australasicus, commonly called Atherton palm or Queensland kentia. The two Greek words from which it is named translate to "reservoir" and "spadix".

Description
Laccospadix australasicus may be solitary or clustering, in the former the trunks will grow to around 10 cm in width while clustering plants are closer to 5 cm wide. The trunks may be dark green to almost black at the base, lightening with age, and conspicuously ringed by leaf scars. Lone trunks will reach 7 m in height while the suckering varieties grow to 3.5 m. The leaves are pinnate, emerging erect with a slight arch, to 2 m on 1 m or less petioles; the petioles and rachises are usually covered in scales. The new foliage is often red to bronze, a feature more common in solitary individuals.

The inflorescence is a long, unbranched spike, emerging within the leaf crown, to a meter long, carrying male and female flowers, both with three sepals and three longer petals. Laccospadix fruit is slightly ovoid, one-seeded and bright red, with a smooth epicarp and a thin fleshy mesocarp.

Distribution and habitat 
Found in Queensland, Australia at elevations of 800–1400 m in humid rain forest, they grow on mountains and plateau where they receive little light.

References

External links 

 Laccospadix on NPGS/GRIN
 Fairchild Guide to Palms: Laccospadix
 GBIF portal
 Plantsystematics.org with images
 Photos at PACSOA

Palms of Australia
Flora of Queensland
Laccospadicinae
Monotypic Arecaceae genera
Taxa named by Carl Georg Oscar Drude
Taxa named by Hermann Wendland